Elmhurst Avenue may refer to the following stations of the New York City Subway in Queens:

90th Street – Elmhurst Avenue (IRT Flushing Line), serving the  train
Elmhurst Avenue (IND Queens Boulevard Line), serving the  trains